Varah is an English surname. Notable people with this surname include:

 Chad Varah (1911–2007), British Anglican priest
 John Varah Long (1826–1869)
 Michael Varah (1944–2007), British middle-distance runner and probation officer

See also
 Varah Mihir or Varāhamihira, Hindu astronomer